The Mexican Fencing Federation (Federación Mexicana de Esgrima) is the ruling body of all kinds of fencing in Mexico and operates under the aegis of CONADE (Comisión Nacional de Cultura Física y Deporte). Jorge Castro Rea is the current president of the federation.

Mexico
Fen
Fencing organizations
Fencing in Mexico